Renato Polselli (1922–2006) was an Italian film director and writer. Born in Arce, Lazio on 26 February 1922, Polselli began directing films in Italy in the early 1950s. He is best known for directing and writing the film The Vampire and the Ballerina. Polselli's film work since the 1970s was sporadic, and included work on horror film productions that remained unfinished. His later film works were often pornography made with his frequent collaborator Bruno Vanni. Polselli died in Italy on 1 October 2006.

Style
In his book on Italian horror film directors, Louis Paul described Polselli as being "a bit of a mystery" due to the rarity of films surrounding his work and that his work in horror films were "some of the most original, hallucinatory and sleazy, low-budget productions in the genre". Paul described his early efforts such as The Vampire and the Ballerina and The Vampire of the Opera as following the trends of Italian horror films of that era, with overtly sexual themes and being influenced by Hammer Horror films of the era.

Select filmography

References

Footnotes

References

External links

1922 births
2006 deaths
Italian male screenwriters
20th-century Italian screenwriters
Italian film directors
Horror film directors
20th-century Italian male writers